The Samsung ATIV S was a touchscreen, slate smartphone manufactured by Samsung Electronics running the Windows Phone 8 operating system, upgradeable to Windows Phone 8.1. The ATIV S was Samsung's first Windows Phone 8 device, and one of the first devices under its ATIV series of Microsoft Windows-based products. It was shown at the IFA 2012 in Berlin and was the first Windows Phone 8 device to be officially unveiled, ahead of the Nokia Lumia 920.

There were three variants of the ATIV S. All feature a 4.8-inch 1280x720 HD Super AMOLED display with a pixel density of 306ppi, a 1.5 GHz dual-core processor, 1 GB of RAM, an 8-megapixel rear-facing camera, near field communications, and support for HSPA+ networks. Specific variants include:

 GT-I8750 - the globalized version of the ATIV S, with a 1.9MP front-facing camera
 GT-I8370 - a version specific to the UK, Canada and Singapore but with a 1.2MP front camera instead of 1.9MP
 SGH-T899M - sold in Canada, equipped with 700 MHz LTE and Bluetooth 2.1 (downgraded from 3.0)

The ATIV S was available with 16 or 32 GB of internal storage with micro SDXC expansion for up to an additional 128 GB or more. It further featured a 2300mAh removable battery and a brushed-metal look of the battery door. Overall, the hardware was very similar to the Android-based Galaxy S III.

A variant of the Samsung ATIV S, called the Samsung ATIV S Neo, was announced by Sprint on 26 June 2013 for a summer 2013 release, alongside the HTC 8XT. This phone's appearance is similar to the ATIV S, though has notable differences spec-wise, having 1.4 GHz processor speed, a 2000mAh battery, TFT LCD screen, and LTE connectivity.

Languages
Depending on the region where the device was purchased from, the following languages are available, some not being made available until later updates were released.
 Azərbaycan 
 Bahasa Indonesia 
 Bahasa Malaysia 
 Català 
 Čeština 
 Dansk 
 Deutsch (Deutschland) 
 Deutsch (Österreich) 
 Deutsch (Schweiz) 
 Eesti 
 English (Australia) 
 English (Canada) 
 English (Ireland) 
 English (New Zealand) 
 English (Philippines) 
 English (South Africa) 
 English (United Kingdom) 
 English (United States) 
 Español (España) 
 Español (Estados Unidos) 
 Euskara 
 Filipino 
 Français (Belgique) 
 Français (Canada) 
 Français (France) 
 Français (Suisse) 
 Galego 
 Hrvatski 
 Íslenska 
 Italiano 
 Latviešu 
 Lietuvių 
 Magyar 
 Nederlands (België) 
 Nederlands (Nederland) 
 Norsk bokmål 
 O‘zbek 
 Polski 
 Português (Brasil) 
 Português (Portugal) 
 Română 
 Shqip 
 Slovenčina 
 Slovenščina 
 Srpski 
 Suomi 
 Svenska 
 Tiếng Việt 
 Türkçe 
 Ελληνικά 
 Беларуская 
 Български 
 Қазақ тілі 
 Македонски 
 Русский 
 Українська 
 עברית 
 العربية (إسرائيل) 
 العربية (الإمارات العربية المتحدة) 
 فارسی 
 हिन्दी 
 ไทย 
 한국어 
 中文 (中華人民共和國香港特別行政區) 
 中文 (新加坡) 
 中文 (简体) 
 中文 (繁體) 
 日本語

See also
 List of Windows Phone devices
 Windows Phone 8
 Windows Phone 8.1
 Windows Phone
 Samsung Ativ Odyssey

References

External links

 

Mobile phones introduced in 2012
Discontinued smartphones
Windows Phone devices
Videotelephony
Samsung smartphones
de:Samsung Ativ#Ativ S